Viasat Sport 24 was a Scandinavian sports channel. The channel started April 24, 2005. Viasat Sport 24 was showing several sports events in different squares on one television channel 24 hours a day complete with sports results, news and betting information. It was replaced by the new sports channel Viasat Golf in January 2007.

V Sport
Television channels and stations established in 2005
Television channels and stations disestablished in 2007
Defunct television channels in Sweden
Defunct television channels in Norway
Defunct television channels in Denmark
Defunct television channels in Finland